Lanto Griffin (born June 15, 1988) is an American professional golfer on the PGA Tour.

Early life
Griffin was born in Mount Shasta, California and moved with his family at a young age to Blacksburg, Virginia. He played college golf at Virginia Commonwealth University where he was the 2009 Colonial Athletic Association Player of the Year. He turned professional in 2010.

Professional career
Griffin played on the PGA Tour Latinoamérica in 2015 and 2016. He won the Roberto De Vicenzo Punta del Este Open Copa NEC in 2015. Also in 2015, Griffin won the Virginia Open.

At the Web.com Tour qualifying tournament in December 2016, Griffin missed qualification by just one stroke.  Nonetheless, this enabled him to enter tournaments in 2017 as a reserve, and to be eligible for a place in the reorder category. 

Griffin won the Nashville Golf Open in June 2017, becoming the first player on tour in 13 years to win an event after making the cut on the number. He finished 23rd on the regular season Web.com Tour money list to secure his PGA Tour card for the 2017–18 season.

During the 2017–18 PGA season Griffin finished 171st in FedEx points.

Griffin played on the Korn Ferry Tour during its 2019 season and finished 6th overall for the regular season (The 25) driven by consistent performance and a win at the Robert Trent Jones Golf Trail Championship, earning him a spot on the PGA Tour for the second time.

Griffin had a great start to the 2019–20 PGA Tour season. He finished in the top-20 at A Military Tribute at The Greenbrier, the Sanderson Farms Championship, the Safeway Open, the Shriners Hospitals for Children Open, and the Bermuda Championship. On October 13, 2019, Griffin earned his first PGA Tour victory by winning the Houston Open.

Professional wins (5)

PGA Tour wins (1)

Korn Ferry Tour wins (2)

Korn Ferry Tour playoff record (2–0)

PGA Tour Latinoamérica wins (1)

Other wins (1)
2015 Virginia Open

Results in major championships
Results not in chronological order before 2019 and in 2020.

CUT = missed the halfway cut
"T" = Tied
NT = No tournament due to COVID-19 pandemic

Results in The Players Championship

CUT = missed the halfway cut
"T" indicates a tie for a place

Results in World Golf Championships

1Cancelled due to COVID-19 pandemic

NT = No tournament
"T" = Tied

See also
2017 Web.com Tour Finals graduates
2019 Korn Ferry Tour Finals graduates

References

External links

American male golfers
PGA Tour golfers
Korn Ferry Tour graduates
Golfers from California
Golfers from Virginia
Virginia Commonwealth University alumni
People from Mount Shasta, California
People from Blacksburg, Virginia
1988 births
Living people